is a 1971 Japanese film directed by Yasuharu Hasebe. Yūjirō Ishihara produced the film by himself and made his final appearance in the Nikkatsu film.

Konno's girl friend was killed by Shiraishi. He left Japan to forget it. But Konno goes back to Japan for the first time in five years from Canada.

Cast
Yūjirō Ishihara as Tadao Konno
Joe Shishido as Kenzo Shiraki
 Ryōhei Uchida as Tsuyushi Shiraishi 
 Tamio Kawachi as Funada
Masaya Oki as Osamu Ogata
Hideji Ōtaki as Tatsukichi Agawa

References

External links

Nikkatsu films
1970s Japanese films